The Sir Peter Hall Award for Best Director is an annual award presented by the Society of London Theatre in recognition of achievements in commercial London theatre. The awards were established as the Society of West End Theatre Awards in 1976, and renamed in 1984 in honour of English actor and director Laurence Olivier.

Introduced in 1976 as the award for Best Director, it was renamed in 2018 in honor of acclaimed theatre director Sir Peter Hall, beginning with the 2019 award ceremony.

In 1991, the category was briefly retired and divided into the categories Best Director of a Play and Best Director of a Musical. These two categories were in turn retired in 1995, and the Best Director award was reinstated.

Robert Icke became the Best Director award's youngest ever winner in 2016; Deborah Warner, the 1988 recipient, had previously been the youngest winner.

Only five women have ever won the award: Deborah Warner, Marianne Elliott, Lyndsey Turner, Miranda Cromwell and Rebecca Frecknall.

Winners and nominees

1970s

1980s

1990s

2000s

2010s

2020s

Multiple awards and nominations
Note: This list of multiple awards and nominations includes individuals awarded and nominated for the Best Director award (1976–1990, 1996–present), as well as the short-lived (1991–1995) more granular pair of awards for Best Director of a Play and Best Director of a Musical.

Awards
Three awards
Howard Davies
Stephen Daldry
Declan Donnellan
Richard Eyre
Sam Mendes

Two awards
Michael Bogdanov
Rupert Goold
Terry Hands
Nicholas Hytner
Trevor Nunn
Deborah Warner
Marianne Elliott

Nominations
Ten nominations
Richard Eyre
Trevor Nunn

Nine nominations
Sam Mendes

Six nominations
Howard Davies
Nicholas Hytner

Five nominations
Declan Donnellan
Michael Grandage
Adrian Noble
Marianne Elliott

Four nominations
Michael Blakemore
Stephen Daldry
Rupert Goold
Ian Rickson
Matthew Warchus

Three nominations
Michael Bogdanov
Bill Bryden
Dominic Cooke
Terry Hands
Simon McBurney
Peter Wood

Two nominations

See also
 Drama Desk Award for Outstanding Director of a Musical
 Tony Award for Best Direction of a Musical

References

External links
 

Director